The 2017 FIA Junior World Rally Championship was the sixteenth season of the Junior World Rally Championship, an auto racing championship recognised by the Fédération Internationale de l'Automobile, running in support of the World Rally Championship.

The Junior World Rally Championship was open to drivers born after 1 January 1988—although no such restriction existed for co-drivers—and they competed in identical one-litre Ford Fiesta R2s built and maintained by M-Sport, with DMACK tyres. Crews who contested the Junior World Rally Championship were also eligible to score points in the World Rally Championship-3. The championship was competed over six European WRC rounds. Nil Solans was crowned champion at the end of the season.

Calendar

The final 2017 Junior World Rally Championship calendar consisted of six European events, taken from the 2017 World Rally Championship.

Entries

The following crews competed in the championship.

Regulation changes

The series will change from using Citroën DS3 R3Ts with Michelin tyres, to use Ford Fiesta R2 prepared by M-Sport with DMACK tyres.

The championship will also adopt the prize format of the Drive DMACK Fiesta Trophy in which the season will be divided into "stages" and a prize awarded to the top-placed driver in each stage (contrary to the previous Junior World Rally Championship, in which there was only one prize). The driver with most points after the first two rallies will be awarded two drives in the 2018 World Rally Championship-2 in a Ford Fiesta R5. The driver with most points scored in the second pair of rallies will win an equal prize, as will the top-placed driver in the third pair of rallies. Additionally, an extra prize drive will be awarded to the overall winner of the category.

Season report

The season started with the Tour de Corse where Nil Solans won the event from start to finish. After building a lead of more than 40 seconds in the first Leg, he managed he was chased by local Terry Folb, until a driveshaft problem made him lost his second place to fellow Frenchman Nicolas Ciamin.

Results and standings

Season summary

Scoring system
Points are awarded to the top ten classified finishers. An additional point is given for every stage win. The best 5 classification results count towards the drivers’ and co-drivers’ totals, but stage points from all 6 rounds can be retained.

FIA Junior World Rally Championship for Drivers

FIA Junior World Rally Championship for Co-Drivers

FIA Junior World Rally Championship for Nations

References

External links
 Official website of the World Rally Championship

World Rally Championship